The Georgia–South Carolina football rivalry is an American college football rivalry between the Georgia Bulldogs and South Carolina Gamecocks. The rivalry started in 1894, and has been played annually since the Gamecocks joined the Southeastern Conference (SEC) in 1992. Georgia leads the series 54-19–2 through the 2022 season.

Both of these SEC members coincidentally are flagship universities of their respective state systems, and are classified by the Carnegie Classification of Institutions of Higher Education as a Research I university,  the same designation as their sibling science, technology, engineering, and mathematics schools from the ACC — with which they also have intense rivalries: Georgia's Clean, Old-Fashioned Hate rivalry with the Georgia Tech Yellow Jackets, and South Carolina's Palmetto Bowl game against the Clemson Tigers.

Emergence of the rivalry
Traditionally, Georgia has had three main rivals: Georgia Tech, Auburn, and Florida.
 The two schools played periodically until South Carolina's entrance into the SEC in 1992.
 Recruiting battles have always existed between the two, but intensified due to South Carolina's success under head coach Steve Spurrier.
 Georgia's fan base has disliked former South Carolina football coach, Steve Spurrier, since his days as head coach at the University of Florida.
 The series between the two schools became especially competitive during the Steve Spurrier years, with Spurrier's Gamecocks holding an almost perfectly even 5–6 record against Georgia.
 The game has traditionally been nationally televised to a large audience (Dating back to 1996, either on CBS, ESPN or ESPN2 except in 2016 and 2020).

Notable games
 1980: One of the most memorable games was the 1980 game between Heisman Trophy hopefuls George Rogers and Herschel Walker. Led by Walker's 219 rushing yards, Georgia won 13–10 and went on to win the national title. Rogers turned in 168 rushing yards in the contest, setting the stage for a successful finish to his Heisman Trophy campaign.
1984: This game was a memorable upset. Before the season began, Mike Hold, South Carolina's backup quarterback, was thinking about transferring to Arizona State. Offensive coordinator Frank Sadler had told Hold that as long as he was offensive coordinator, he would never play. Hold called his dad and announced he was transferring, but his dad told him to stay one more week for the Georgia game. Starting quarterback Allen Mitchell was injured, and Hold had a 66-yard quick kick and a 62-yard pass to Ira Hillary that set up the game-winning touchdown, which he scored on a two-yard run. The result was a 17-10 upset over #12 Georgia that jump started a 10-1 season. Hold later stayed and said that it "was the best decision I've ever made in my life."
 1993: South Carolina defeated #14 Georgia in Athens 23–21 when running back Brandon Bennett dove over the pile into the end zone with two seconds left to give South Carolina just their 10th victory ever against Georgia.
 2000: South Carolina's defense intercepted Heisman Trophy hopeful Quincy Carter five times in a 21–10 upset of the #10 Bulldogs in Columbia. The victory broke an 18-game SEC losing streak for the Gamecocks.
 2002: Georgia linebacker David Pollack batted down and intercepted a pass from South Carolina quarterback Corey Jenkins in the South Carolina end zone. This memorable play jump-started a quiet Georgia team, leading to a 13–7 victory.
 2004: Georgia fell down early 16–0 thanks to a pick-six and an amazing touchdown catch and run by Troy Williamson. However, David Greene led a second-half comeback, complete with a deep touchdown pass to Reggie Brown late in the fourth. Georgia won 20–16 and kept their SEC hopes alive.
 2005: D. J. Shockley's first SEC start after being named the player of the week by the SEC for the opener against Boise State. The Heisman campaign by Shockley came crashing down against South Carolina as the Gamecocks stifled the Georgia offense. Georgia would survive and win 17–15.
 2006: Georgia entered the game ranked #12 in what many believed (and later proved) to be a rebuilding year for the program.  Joe Tereshinski started the game but was injured early on and Georgia was forced into playing the #1 QB recruit in true freshman Matthew Stafford. Stafford showed off his arm strength on a few throws, but ended up having a very freshman-like performance, throwing 3 interceptions. The Bulldogs relied on a stingy defense, that held South Carolina to only 35 yards on the ground in 22 attempts in the 18–0 win.  Just a day prior, former UGA defensive coordinator Erk Russell had died.  In a fitting tribute to a Georgia great, the Georgia defense posted their first shutout in three years and only the second shutout of Spurrier's coaching career.
 2007: South Carolina's second win against Georgia in the Richt era. The Gamecocks won 16–12, holding off a late drive by Georgia and recording an interception to end the game. This game would go on to cost Georgia the SEC East and a chance at an SEC and even national title as Georgia's only other loss would be to Tennessee, who would go on to win the East because of a tiebreaker over Georgia. South Carolina would finish the year 6-6 after a 6-1 start and Georgia would beat Hawaii in the Sugar Bowl to finish ranked #2 in the AP Poll.
 2008: The second-ranked Bulldogs won a low scoring game on particularly hot and humid day in Williams-Brice Stadium. A goal-line fumble forced by Rennie Curran and a late game interception from Reshad Jones preserved an otherwise unimpressive 14–7 victory.
 2009: Considered an instant classic, South Carolina jumped all over the Bulldogs, taking an early 17–7 lead, but #21 Georgia stormed back and won a shootout, 41–37, sealed by a batted pass in the end zone by linebacker Rennie Curran.
 2010: The matchup in Columbia highlighted the archetype of the rivalry – a low scoring defensive shootout. #24 South Carolina defeated #22 Georgia 17–6, pulling away late in the game. Freshman running back Marcus Lattimore ran for 182 yards on 37 carries in his SEC debut.  This victory set the stage for South Carolina's run to the SEC Eastern division.
 2011: The 2011 game proved to be almost identical to the 2009 game. The #12 Gamecocks defeated the unranked Bulldogs in Athens 45–42. South Carolina defensive end Melvin Ingram became the third player since 2006 to score a touchdown both on offense and defense in the same game, a 68-yard run on a fake punt and a 5-yard fumble return.  He also recovered an onside kick late in the game to seal the victory for the Gamecocks.  South Carolina was the division leader for the majority of the season until the Gamecocks lost to the Arkansas Razorbacks, resulting in a Bulldog berth in the championship game.
 2012: #6 South Carolina defeated #5 Georgia 35–7 in front of a record crowd (85,199) at Williams-Brice Stadium, the highest-ranked matchup of the teams in series history and the first time the Gamecocks have won three in a row over the Bulldogs. It remains the largest margin of victory in the series for the Gamecocks.
 2013: #11 Georgia snapped #6 South Carolina's three game win streak against the Bulldogs and got a 41–30 win. A career day by Georgia quarterback Aaron Murray who had 309 passing yards and 4 touchdowns to go along with 132 rushing yards and touchdown by running back Todd Gurley led the Georgia win.
2014 : #6 Georgia was favored to defeat #24 South Carolina. However, SC had other ideas, and took a 24–13 lead at the half thanks to 3 touchdowns passing from Dylan Thompson. South Carolina extended the lead to 31–20 with a short  TD run from Thompson. Feeling pressure, Georgia QB Hutson Mason threw a TD to Jay Rome. The Dawgs got the 2-point conversion, and trailed 31–28. Brandon Wilds then ran for a TD to put the Gamecocks up 38–28. Georgia scored again to cut it to 38–35, and Dylan Thompson was intercepted in his own red-zone. Georgia couldn't move the ball and settled for a Marshall Morgan field goal. The kick went just right of the uprights and was no good. On the ensuing drive South Carolina converted a fourth and inches near midfield  that allowed them to kneel the rest of the clock out, winning 38–35. The Gamecocks reached #13 two weeks later, but a loss to Missouri sent them out of the rankings and to a 7–6 finish. Georgia went 10–3 and narrowly missed out on an SEC East Title.
2016: This game was postponed to Sunday due to Hurricane Matthew and South Carolina and Georgia both had two new coaches in Will Muschamp and Kirby Smart (both of which had served as assistants under Nick Saban). Georgia won 28-14.
2017 : Led by freshman Jake Fromm (who took over for former 5-star Jacob Eason when he got hurt in the season opener) Georgia had reached #1 in the CFP poll, entering November with an 8–0 record. They were closely tested against a 6–2 South Carolina team, as Georgia led just 14–7 at halftime. Ultimately, Georgia hung on for a 24–10 win. Fromm went 16/22 for 196 yards and 2 TDS for Georgia.
2019 : Undefeated, No. 3 Georgia came into the game as a 24.5-point favorite at home against unranked South Carolina. South Carolina had lost 3 games, including one to North Carolina, who had previously gone 2–9 in 2018. Shockingly, South Carolina upset Georgia 20–17 in double overtime behind Israel Mukuamu's 3 interceptions, including one returned for a touchdown late in the second quarter. South Carolina would only win one more game after this against Vanderbilt and finish 4–8. Georgia would go on to finish 12–2 and lose the SEC Championship to LSU, but would rebound by defeating Baylor in the Sugar Bowl.

Schedule change
In most years, since the 1991 SEC conference expansion, the game was the first conference game on the schedule for both teams. The game was typically held during the second week of the season with a non-conference game being played prior. (This was typically the case with a few early exceptions where the game was the first game of the season for both programs.) Due to SEC expansion in 2012, the schedule needed to be modified to accommodate new SEC members Texas A&M and Missouri. These became known as "bridge" schedules because they were meant to be temporary scheduling formats used to bridge the gap between the formats of 5–1–2, pre-expansion, and 6–1–1, which was agreed upon by the SEC membership as the new format. The 2012 "bridge" schedule, issued by the SEC home office, moved the UGA-USC game to October 6, 2012. However, in 2013 the SEC offices saw fit, even in the face of issuing another "bridge" schedule, to move the yearly tilt between the two programs back to the second week of the season for each program stating that the game would fill needed conference TV inventory for the early week in the season. At the same time the SEC announced that another "bridge" schedule would be issued for 2014, but that schedule has yet to be released by the SEC home office in Birmingham, Alabama. However, later the SEC released a 2014 schedule that is not a bridge schedule, and also released the future cross-division opponents for each team for the 2014–2025 seasons. Additionally, while USC remained as UGA's first conference game, the first conference game for USC was a week 1 game against Texas A&M. It remains to be seen if this is a permanent change to USC's schedule, as the SEC has yet to release schedules for 2018 and beyond. In 2016, the game was postponed from Saturday October 8 to Sunday October 9 due to the effects of Hurricane Matthew.

Game results

Border Bash 
The Border Bash is an annual event held in Augusta, Georgia on the banks of the Savannah River celebrating Georgia–South Carolina rivalry. It is held on the Friday prior to the yearly UGA-USC football game.  The event is supported by numerous business and private sponsors from both sides of the river. The evening event regularly draws over 10,000 fans from both fan-bases and proceeds are used to support numerous children's charities from around the CSRA through the Border Bash Foundation.  Both mascots, as well as each program's cheerleaders, represent their programs at the event along with various dignitaries from the schools themselves. Neither the football coaches or the ballplayers attend due to conflicts with their pregame preparations.

See also 
 List of NCAA college football rivalry games

References

Additional sources
 The Tuscaloosa News – Google News Archive Search
 Waycross Journal-Herald – Google News Archive Search
 No rivalry in area tops Bulldogs vs. Gamecocks | The Augusta Chronicle

College football rivalries in the United States
South Carolina Gamecocks football
Georgia Bulldogs football